Bashir Salihi Magashi  (born 1 October 1949) is a retired Nigerian army major general and current Defence Minister of Nigeria. He was appointed Governor of Sokoto State from August 1990 to January 1992 during the military regime of General Ibrahim Babangida. He was appointed Nigeria's Minister of Defence by President Muhammadu Buhari on 21 August 2019.

Early life 
He was admitted to the Nigerian Defence Academy in 1968 and commissioned into the Nigerian Army in 1971 as a member of the 5th Regular Combatant Course. He also attended the Ahmadu Bello University in Zaria, where he obtained an advanced diploma in public administration, LLB Honors and a call to the Nigerian Bar with a  BL Hons in 1984.

He started his career as a platoon commander and later became company commander at the historic and elite 6 infantry Battalion (Bn) of the Nigerian Army. He was later deployed as adjutant 1st Guards Battalion Bn and later commander of The 4 Guards battalion in Epe Lagos; He was also commander, 93 Mechanized Bn and commander, 192 Mechanized Bn. He also served as deputy military secretary (DMS 2) 1984-1985 and (DMS 1) 1985–1987 at the Army Headquarters (AHQ MS A), Cadets Brigade commander in Nigerian Defence Academy 1988-1990 and as the commander, 7 Mechanized Infantry Brigade in Sokoto in 1990.

The General was later appointed as commander of the 15 Brigade of the ECOWAS Monitoring Group (ECOMOG) mission in Liberia in 
1992 before commanding the Nigerian Contingent Force in 1993. He served as commander of the Guards Brigade in Abuja from 1993 to 1996. General Magashi subsequently rose to become general officer commanding of the 2nd Division Ibadan and later proceeded to the Lagos Garrison Command as command. He finally retired from the Nigerian Army as commandant, Nigerian Defence Academy Kaduna from 1998 to 1999 as his last official engagement as a Military Officer.

He was a member of the Provisional Ruling Council from 1996 to 1999, a member of the Association of Humanitarian Lawyers and equally an honorable member of the Nigerian Red Cross Society.

He has attended various leadership and management courses both home and abroad. He is a graduate of the International Institute of Humanitarian Law in Italy and a Member of the Senior Executives Course 14 of the National Institute of Policy and Strategic Studies Kuru in Jos.

He also had served as the military governor of Sokoto State from August 1990 to January 1992. In the political sphere, he was in 2002 the legal adviser to the ALL Nigerian Peoples Party ANPP and in 2007, the Kano State governorship candidate of the Democratic People's Party (DPP). He later became the national chairman of the party before finally retiring from politics in 2014.

Personal life
He is married with children and enjoys reading, football and athletics. He also occasionally plays golf.

He is a recipient of the Forces Service Star (FSS), Meritorious Service Star (MSS) and The Distinguished Service Star (DSS). His decorations also include the ECOMOG MEDAL and Silver Jubilee Medal. He has also received distinguished National awards and titles including Commander Order of the Niger (CON) and the prestigious Commander of the Federal Republic (CFR).

Career
During the intrigues leading to General Sani Abacha's assumption of power in November 1993, Brig. General Bashir S Magashi was given command of the Brigade of Guards in September. He was a member of the Sani Abacha Military Caucus that reviewed the military and the political situation resulting from annulment of 12 June 1993 
Shortly after democracy was restored in May 1999, the government announced the compulsory retirement of all armed forces officers who had served for six or more months in military governments, including Major-General Bashir Magashi. In 2002, he was legal advisor to the All Nigeria People's Party ANPP.
In April 2007 he was Kano State governorship candidate of the Democratic People's Party(DPP).

He is currently the Nigeria's Minister of Defence. He was appointed by President Muhammadu Buhari on 21 August 2019.

Allegations
An investigation by Nigerian-based Newspaper – Premium Times, reported that Magashi as army officer was engaged in illegal oil crude oil allocation and funds from trade in tune of $550,000 at Jersey UK, branch of Bank PNP Paribus.

See also
Cabinet of Nigeria

Award 
In October 2022, a Nigerian national honour of Commander of the Order of the Federal Republic (CFR) was conferred on him by President Muhammadu Buhari.

References

Nigerian generals
Living people
Nigerian military governors of Sokoto State
Nigerian Army Brigade of Guards Commanders
Nigerian Defence Academy people
Nigerian Defence Academy Commandants
Federal ministers of Nigeria
Defence ministers of Nigeria
Nigerian Defence Academy alumni
Ahmadu Bello University alumni
1949 births